Ulsan National Institute of Science and Technology, simply referred to as UNIST, is one of the four public universities in South Korea which are dedicated to research in science and technology, along with KAIST, GIST, and DGIST. UNIST was founded in 2007 in response to growing demand for higher education in the Korean industrial capital of Ulsan, where world-renowned automotive (Hyundai Motor), shipbuilding (Hyundai Heavy Industries), petrochemical (SK Energy), and secondary cells industries are clustered. At the time of its foundation, UNIST was known for being the first national university in South Korea to be incorporated and thus administered by an independent board of trustees despite being funded by the central government.

History

Despite the fact that Ulsan, with over 1.1 million residents, is an industrial powerhouse of South Korea with the highest GDP per capita among any region in the country, there only existed one university within the city limits, the University of Ulsan. The former president Roh Mu-hyun included the establishment of a national university in Ulsan as part of his campaigning platform and a discussion regarding the university began three years into his presidency along with the construction of a new high speed rail station, Ulsan Station, for the city.

The location of the campus was finalized in 2006 and in 2007, Moo Je Cho was selected as the first president of the new university. Cho appealed to the public that the school should be a science and technology oriented institute in order for the new school to find its niche and to take advantage of a possible synergetic effect resulting from a collaboration between the researchers and the local industry as seen in the case of Stanford University and Silicon Valley or KAIST and Daedeock Innopolis.

UNIST was established by the UNIST bill that was passed in 2007 by the request of the people and city of Ulsan. In 2009, UNIST opened its doors to welcome its first class of undergraduate students.

In March 2015, a new bill was passed in the national assembly recognizing UNIST as one of the four nationally funded research institutes in Korea. Besides changing the Korean name of the school from Ulsan Gwahak Gisurdae (울산과학기술대) to Ulsan Gwahak Gisurwon (울산과학기술원), the passage of this bill implied a new set of additional changes and benefits from the national government including but not limited to a greater emphasis on graduate education and the waiver of the alternative military service examination for its PhD students.

On 12 May 2019, the university has celebrated its 10th anniversary from the day of its opening. The ceremony lasted the entire day, and several UNIST members and distinguished guests, such as National Assembly members Lee Chae-ik, Jeong Kab-yoon, and Kang Ghil-boo, Ulju County mayor Lee Seon-ho, among others. The ceremony was sponsored by KBS and BNK Kyongnam Bank. A commemorative open concert was held in the evening of the same day and was broadcast via Korean Broadcasting Service. The concert was attended by some 7000 people.

Timeline

University rankings 

In 2017, the Times Higher Education ranked UNIST 201-250th in the world.

In 2018, the Times Higher Education ranked UNIST 201-250th in the world.

In 2019, the U.S. News & World Report Best Global University Ranking ranked UNIST 368th in the world, 51st in Asia, 7th in Korea. Times Higher Education World University Rankings ranked UNIST 201-250th in the world, 20th amongst world's youngest universities (Universities that are 50 years old or younger), and 22nd best university in Asia.

In 2021, the Times Higher Education ranked UNIST 178th in the world, 21st in Asia, 5th in Korea, 5th amongst world’s youngest universities.

Academics
UNIST is a medium-sized, research oriented university. Modeled after other universities around the world such as KAIST, MIT and HKUST the school employed three approaches that would set UNIST apart from other universities in Korea. First, despite being a national university of Korea, 100% of the courses at UNIST are taught in English and the school is actively seeking ways to recruit international students and professors. Second, all undergraduate students are required to pursue two areas of specializations called 'tracks'. The first track is roughly equivalent to a major and the second track is comparable to a minor at other universities. Third, UNIST has adopted the flipped learning approach in its classrooms in order to promote active student participation and mastery of the core subjects in science and engineering.

UNIST comprises 13 science and engineering departments, a business school, and the School of Liberal Arts, which oversees the school's first year undergraduate curriculum. In addition, there are several specialized graduate schools and research centers.

Undergraduate schools
Department of Mechanical Engineering
Department of Urban and Environmental Engineering
Department of Materials Science and Engineering
Department of Nuclear Engineering
School of Design
School of Biomedical Engineering
Department of Industrial Engineering
Department of Biological Engineering
Department of Electrical Engineering
Department of Computer Science and Engineering
Department of Physics
Department of Mathematical Science
Department of Chemistry
School of Energy and Chemical Engineering
School of Business Administration
School of Liberal Arts

Graduate schools
Graduate School of Technology & Innovation Management
Graduate School of Creative Design Engineering
Graduate School of Interdisciplinary Management 
Graduate School of Artificial Intelligence 
Graduate School of Semiconductor Materials and Devices Engineering

Affiliated research centers
KOGIC: Korean Genomics Center at UNIST
Hans Schöler Stem Cell Research Center
Institute for Basic Science (IBS) is a nationally funded research organization in South Korea consisting of a number of labs in universities around the country. UNIST is home to 3 IBS affiliated labs, namely: 
Center for Multidimensional Carbon Materials (Director Rodney Ruoff)
Center for Soft and Living Matter (Director Steve Granick)
Center for Genomic Integrity (Director Myung Kyungjae)

Campus
UNIST maintains a fully residential campus. Its location, Eonyang, is adjacent to the old Ulsan city and small mountains surround the whole campus. At the center of the campus, there sits a large man-made pond called Gamakmot.

Note
All courses are taught in English.
Almost all students live in dormitories.
All undergraduate students and graduate students in good standing receive full-tuition and living expenses from the university.
UNIST is actively recruiting international researchers and graduate level students.

Gallery

See also
List of national universities in South Korea
List of universities and colleges in South Korea
Education in Korea

References

See also

 Education in South Korea
 List of colleges and universities in South Korea

National universities and colleges in South Korea
Ulsan National Institute of Science and Technology
Educational institutions established in 2007
2007 establishments in South Korea
Institute for Basic Science